Plus Minus is a music group that formed in 2003 specializing in contemporary classical music.

Plus Minus's programming features a mixture of avant-garde and experimental traditions, focussing particularly on open-instrumentation pieces such as Stockhausen's Plus Minus, Andriessen's Worker's Union and Cardew's Treatise. They have done profile concerts of Peter Ablinger, Michael Finnissy, Christopher Fox, Bryn Harrison and Phill Niblock, and have premiered works by Laurence Crane, David Helbich, Damien Ricketson, Oyvind Torvund, Erik Ulman, James Saunders, and Stefan Van Eyken.

Members
There are eight members in the ensemble:

 Mark Knoop – conductor/piano/accordion
 Vicky Wright – clarinet(s)
 Roderick Chadwick – piano
 Tom Pauwels – (electric) guitar
 Marcus Barcham-Stevens – violin
 Alex Waterman – cello
 Joanna Bailie & Matthew Shlomowitz – auxiliary instruments.

References
 BBC
 Cutting Edge Series

External links
 Plus Minus website

Contemporary classical music ensembles
Musical groups established in 2003
2003 establishments in England
Musical groups from the United Kingdom with local place of origin missing